Deirdre Sutton is a former camogie player, winner of the Cuchulainn all star award in 1963, the first major national award instituted in the Irish field sport for women of camogie.

Career
She was the outstanding personality on Cork's Munster championship winning team of 1963 and played on Munster teams that won the Gael Linn Cup inter provincial series in 1963 and 1964. She also starred for Glen Rovers in the All Ireland club championship semi-finals of 1964 against Celtic and 1967 against Eoghan Rua.

Return
Having regraded to junior in 1971, she returned to win two All Ireland senior medals as goalkeeper in 1972 and 1973, as well as playing in the finals of 1974 and 1975. She played for Glen Rovers in the Cork county final of 1983.

References

External links
 Camogie.ie Official Camogie Association Website
 Wikipedia List of Camogie players

Camogie goalkeepers
Cork camogie players
Year of birth missing
Possibly living people